In theoretical physics, the word meta-operator is sometimes used to refer to a specific operation over a combination of operators, as in the example of path-ordering. A meta-operator is generally neither an operator (a linear transform on the vector space) nor a superoperator (a linear transform on the space of operators).  

Theoretical physics